The Krayot ("townships") (plural of Kirya)  are a cluster of four small cities and two neighbourhoods of Haifa founded in the 1930s  on the outskirts of the city of Haifa, Israel, in the Haifa Bay area.

The Krayot include Kiryat Yam (pop. 36,700), Kiryat Motzkin (pop. 39,800), Kiryat Bialik (pop. 36,200), Kiryat Ata (pop. 33,800), as well as Kiryat Haim (pop. 26,960) and Kiryat Shmuel, Haifa (pop. 5,500, as of 2007.).

A plan was formulated in 2003, and again in 2016 by Interior Minister Aryeh Deri, to merge the Krayot into one municipality. A proposed name for this city is Zvulun (after the biblical Zebulun, and the Zvulun Valley).

See also
Carmel Tunnels

References

 
Kerayot
Geography of Haifa District